Limacia annulata, is a sea slug, a species of dorid nudibranch. It is a marine gastropod mollusc in the family Polyceridae.

Description
The length of the species attains 5.6 mm.

Distribution
Limacia annulata was described from Praia São Tiago, Bengo Province, Angola.

References

Polyceridae
Gastropods described in 2000